Lawsons Creek is a  long 4th order tributary to the Dan River in Halifax County, Virginia.

Course 
Lawsons Creek rises about 3 miles northeast of Cunningham, North Carolina, and then flows northeast to join the Dan River at the southwest side of South Boston.

Watershed 
Lawsons Creek drains  of area, receives about 45.7 in/year of precipitation, has a wetness index of 425.97, and is about 43% forested.

See also 
 List of Virginia Rivers

References

Watershed Maps 

Rivers of Virginia
Rivers of Halifax County, Virginia
Tributaries of the Roanoke River